1990–91 Hong Kong Challenge Shield was the 89th edition of Hong Kong Senior Challenge Shield.

Results
All times are Hong Kong Time (UTC+8).

Bracket

Final

References

Challenge Shield
Hong Kong Challenge Shield